Raval  (also known as Yogi or Raval Yogi ) are a Hindu community, found in Gujarat and Rajasthan.

The term Yogi in Raval Yogi is a colloquial term which refers to the people who practiced yoga as part of their daily rituals. Over the time, this resulted into the formation of a community, and then into a caste. Raval Yogi are believed to be one of the oldest of the Ravaldev group. They are spread all over state in Gujarat.

History and origin

There is a legend about Raval Yogi's origin. It says that once lord Shiva (Shankar) had to go to Kailash mountain for meditation. He had to leave Devi Parvati (Wife of Lord Shiva) behind. Devi Parvati requested lord Shiva (Shankar) to appoint a person to look after her in his absence. Lord Shiva (Shankar) immediately prepared an idol out of dirt and sweat or rav of his body and named him Raval Yogi to look after his consort Parvati.

Being impressed by the services of Raval Yogi, lord Shankar presented him an akshaypatra (a devine pot) to get rid of hunger etc. Raval Yogi once accepted food from Pandavas.

References

Hindu communities